Raymond Township (T10N R4W) is located in Montgomery County, Illinois, United States. As of the 2010 census, its population was 1,200 and it contained 545 housing units.

Geography

Demographics

Adjacent townships
 Harvel Township (north)
 King Township, Christian County (north)
 Ricks Township, Christian County (northeast)
 Rountree Township (east)
 Irving Township (southeast)
 Butler Grove Township (south)
 North Litchfield Township (southwest)
 Zanesville Township, Montgomery County (west)
 Pitman Township (northwest)

References

External links
City-data.com
Illinois State Archives
Historical Society of Montgomery County

Townships in Montgomery County, Illinois
Townships in Illinois